On the Wings of Love may refer to:

 "On the Wings of Love" (song), by Jeffrey Osborne, 1982
 "On the Wings of Love", a song by Westlife, a B-side of the single "I Have a Dream", 1999
 On the Wings of Love (TV series), a 2015 Philippine television series
 The Bachelor: On the Wings of Love, a season of the American reality TV series The Bachelor
 "On the Wings of Love" (Twin Peaks), a television episode

See also
 On Wings of Love, a 1957 Japanese film